Bageshwar is a district of Uttarakhand state in northern India. The town of Bageshwar is the district headquarters. Prior to its establishment as a district in 1997 it was part of Almora district.

Bageshwar district is in Kumaon, and is bounded on the west and northwest by Chamoli District, on the northeast and east by Pithoragarh District, and on the south by Almora District.

As of 2011 it is the third least populous district of Uttarakhand (out of 13), after Rudraprayag and Champawat.

History
The area, that now forms Bageshwar district, was historically known as Danpur, and was ruled by Katyuris during the 7th century AD. After the disintegration of the Katyuri kingdom in the 13th century, the area remained under the rule of Baijnath Katyurs, direct descendants of Katyuri kings. In 1565, king Balo Kalyan Chand annexed Danpur along with Pali, Barahmandal and Mankot to Kumaun.

In 1791, Almora, the seat of the Kumaon, was invaded and annexed by the Gorkhas of Nepal. The Gorkhas ruled the region for 24 years and were later defeated by the East India Company in 1814, and were forced to cede Kumaon to the British as part of the Treaty of Sugauli in 1816. After its annexation by British, Bageshwar was a part of the Danpur pargana in Almora district of United Provinces.

Bageshwar was made a separate tehsil in 1974, and in 1976 it was declared a pargana, after which, it formally came into being as a large administrative center. Since 1985, the demand for declaring it a separate district of different parties and regional people started, and finally, in September 1997, Bageshwar was made the new district of Uttar Pradesh by Chief Minister Mayawati.

Administration
For administrative convenience, Bageshwar is divided in four Tehsils, viz., Bageshwar—comprising 415 inhabited villages; 2) Kanda (with 180 inhabited villages); 3) Kapkot having  156 villages; and Garur having 197 revenue villages. Pattis (viz., Katyur—Talla, Malla and Bichalla ; Dug; Kharahi; Danpur—Talla, Malla, Bichalla; Nakuri; Dafaut and Kamsyar—Walla and Palla) and Development BLOCKS are other administrative units.

Besides regular police at different Thanas like Bageshwar, Garur, Jhiroli, Kanda and Kapkot, the Patwaris (revenue officials) are also equipped with police power.

Geography
From geographical point of view, Bageshwar district is hilly one—amidst Shivalik ranges and high Himalayas. Drainage system is from north to south-east. Main rivers flowing across Bageshwar are - Pindar, Saryu/Sarju, Gomati, and Pungar, the latter two being tributary of Sarju. Many other riverines, locally known as GADHERA meet these at different places. These three river valleys have made alluvial landforms locally known as Seras where majority of population is concentrated. Other villages are settled on hillocks having mild slopes/ or some flat landforms.

Demographics

According to the 2011 census Bageshwar district has a population of 259,898, roughly equal to the nation of Vanuatu. This gives it a ranking of 578th in India (out of a total of 640). Its population growth rate over the decade 2001-2011 was  5.13%. Bageshwar has a sex ratio of 1093 females for every 1000 males, and a literacy rate of 80.69%. Scheduled Castes and Scheduled Tribes make up 27.73% and 0.76% of the population respectively.

The major first language of the district is Kumaoni, which accounted for approximately 94% of the population according to the 2011 census.

 Indian census, the Bagheswar district had a population of 249,462. Hindus 247,402, Muslims 1,280 (.51%), Christians 361.

Assembly Constituencies
Kapkote 
Bageshwar (SC)

Villages
 

Raulyana

References

External links
 
 Bageshwar District Map
 Kumaoni.org - Information on Kumaon Region and Community
 About Bageshwar - http://www.bageshwar.com

 
Districts of Uttarakhand